Gregory Fulton is an American computer game designer best known for his work on the Heroes of Might and Magic series.

Published works
 MechWarrior 2: 31st Century Combat (1995)
Heroes of Might and Magic: Millennium Edition (1999)
Heroes of Might and Magic III: The Restoration of Erathia (1999)
Heroes of Might and Magic III: Armageddon's Blade (1999)
Command & Conquer: Renegade (2002)

References

External links
 
Gregory Fulton at MobyGames

American video game designers
Living people
Year of birth missing (living people)